Universal High is the second studio album by English band Childhood. It was released on 21 July 2017 under Marathon Artists.

Critical reception
Universal High was met with generally favourable reviews from critics. At Metacritic, which assigns a weighted average rating out of 100 to reviews from mainstream publications, this release received an average score of 74, based on 14 reviews.

Track listing

References

2017 albums
Marathon Artists albums